Gontier de Soignies was a medieval trouvère and composer who was active from around 1180 to 1220.

Biography
Gontier was from the region of Soignies in the County of Hainaut, a region that was then a state of the Holy Roman Empire. His life is mostly unknown, although in his works he alludes to travels in France and Burgundy, as well as the protection of the Count Palatine.

One of his works is mentioned in Le Roman de la rose ou de Guillaume de Dole by Jean Renart.

Works
Thirty-four love songs have been ascribed to Gontier, all of which have been preserved in several manuscripts, although only twenty-seven are generally considered to be his. His poetry is lyrics in the high style of the grand chant.

List of the main songs
 A la joie des oiseaus
 L'an ke li dous chans retentist
 Au tens gent que raverdoie
 Biau m'est quant voi verdir les chans
 Douce amours, ki m'atalente
 Doulerousement comence 
 Merci, amors, ore ai mestier
 El mois d'esté que li tens rassoage
 Quant oi el bruel 
 Quant oi tentir et bas et haut 
 Quant li tens torne a verdure
 Se li oisiel baisent lor chans
 Li tans noveaus et la douçors
 Tant ai mon chant entrelaissié
 Chanter m'estuet de recomens

References

Trouvères
French classical composers
French male classical composers
13th-century French poets
French male poets
12th-century French composers
13th-century French composers
12th-century French poets
Medieval male composers